The 9K333 Verba ("Willow") is a Russian fourth-generation man-portable infrared homing surface-to-air missile (SAM) MANPADS. "9K333" is the Russian GRAU designation of the system.
Its NATO reporting name is SA-29.

History
The 9K333 Verba was originally developed as a replacement for the 9K38 Igla.

The Verba's primary new feature is its multispectral optical seeker, using three sensors - ultraviolet, near infrared, and mid-infrared - as opposed to the Igla-S' two. Cross-checking sensors against one another better discriminates between relevant targets and decoys, and decreases the chance of disruption from countermeasures, including lasers that attempt to blind missiles.

According to a KBM spokesperson, the Verba can engage fixed- and rotary-wing aircraft and “new types of threats” such as unmanned aerial vehicles and cruise missiles. “The 9K333 can effectively engage aerial targets with low infrared signature. The system can be coupled to an external identification friend or foe [IFF] unit,” the spokesperson said.

The Verba's containerised 9M336 surface-to-air missile (SAM) can be integrated into ground- and sea-based short-range air-defence (SHORAD) systems. “The SAM can also be used by air platforms,” the spokesperson added.

Production

The system is in serial production for the Russian Armed Forces, with several ground forces and airborne formations receiving Verbas since 2014. It first appeared with the Ivanovo VDV division after passing Army testing in the summer of 2011 and being confirmed for production in late 2011. As of 2015, KBM has equipped the Russian army with three brigade and two divisional sets. Four VDV units received Verba in 2014–15. MANPADS "Verba" passed state tests in 2011. Officially, it entered service in 2015. KBM signed a long-term contract with the Russian Ministry of Defense to supply Verba and carries out its production. As of April 2017, 10 sets have been delivered and 801 systems as of November the same year. Deliveries continue.

Operators

 - Quantity yet unknown with unknown number of SA24 9K38 Igla S. (Armenian and Russian sources)

References

See also

Weapons of Russia
Surface-to-air missiles of Russia
KB Mashinostroyeniya products
Military equipment introduced in the 2010s